Argyria lusella is a moth in the family Crambidae. It was described by Zeller in 1863. It is found on the Virgin Islands.

References

Argyriini
Moths described in 1863
Moths of the Caribbean